is a Japanese film directed by Yasuzo Masumura. The Hoodlum Soldier was the first of a series of nine films that followed two soldiers, Kisaburo Omiya (Shintaro Katsu), a former yakuza who has become a soldier, and Arita (Takahiro Tamura), an intellectual from a good family who has deliberately failed the officer examination.

Plot

The story is presented as a voiced-over narrative by Arita (Takahiro Tamura), speaking long after the events of the film. In a remote army base in Manchuria, near the Soviet border, long-serving corporal Arita hates the military and looks forward to the day he may leave. Although a university graduate, he has several times deliberately failed the exam for promotion and thus remains a corporal after four years' service.

The base commander asks him to take charge of Omiya (Shintaro Katsu), a soldier who responds poorly to military discipline. Discipline at the camp is imposed through beatings, with non-commissioned officers being able to freely punch and kick the lower ranks for infractions and failings. Former yakuza member Omiya proves to be very much tougher than the other soldiers and often responds to the beatings with violence. Arita tries to obtain fair treatment for him, for example refusing to let him be beaten with a wooden bar. Omiya forces his way into a brothel for officers and befriends a prostitute (Keiko Awaji) there.

Arita becomes friends with Omiya and helps him survive a training forced march, in which Omiya's feet become covered with sores. After another infraction, Arita is ordered to beat Omiya. He hits him once with a shinai, but cannot bring himself to hit Omiya more. To save Arita from being disciplined, Omiya hits himself in the face with bricks, drawing blood. After a soldier is beaten by the catering soldiers, and then escapes from the camp and commits suicide, Omiya picks a fight with the catering soldiers. They trick him by pretending to befriend him then attack him in a secluded part of the camp. Arita rescues Omiya.

Omiya is to be sent to the front on a suicide mission to fight the Soviets. Arita and Omiya steal officers' uniforms and pistols with the help of the prostitute. They make an escape by decoupling the engine of the train they are travelling on. The film ends with them speeding away. In the voice-over, Arita says that every man on the train was killed in battle.

Release and availability
A subtitled version of The Hoodlum Soldier was released in the United States by Altura Films International. It is not currently available on video in the US.

Reception

Film critic Tom Mes opines: "In Hoodlum Soldier army life becomes a miniature of version [sic] Japan itself. Men's lives are lived in daily repetition, lives in which duty and loyalty to the group mean everything, and hierarchy is an omnipotent force."

Series
The films in the "Heitai Yakuza" series are:
 (1965) Directed by Yasuzo Masumura
 (1965) Directed by Tokuzō Tanaka
 (1966) Directed by Tokuzō Tanaka
 (1966) Directed by Kazuo Mori
 (1966) Directed by Tokuzō Tanaka
 (1967) Directed by Tokuzō Tanaka
 (1967) Directed by Tokuzō Tanaka
 (1968) Directed by Tokuzō Tanaka
 (1972) Directed by Yasuzo Masumura

References

External links
 
 

1965 films
Japanese war drama films
1960s Japanese-language films
Films directed by Yasuzo Masumura
Films set in Manchukuo
Films produced by Masaichi Nagata
1960s Japanese films
Japanese action drama films